The 2020 United States Senate election in Michigan was held on November 3, 2020, to elect a member of the United States Senate to represent Michigan. It was held concurrently with the 2020 U.S. presidential election, as well as other elections to the United States Senate, elections to the United States House of Representatives and various state and local elections.

Incumbent Gary Peters was one of two Democratic U.S. Senators up for re-election in 2020 in a state President Donald Trump carried in 2016; the other was Doug Jones from Alabama. The primary was held on August 4. The filing deadline for candidates to run in the primary was April 21 but was extended to May 8 due to the COVID-19 pandemic. The election was considered a potential upset pickup by the Republicans due to the state's demographic trends, incumbent Trump's upset win in 2016, and Republican candidate John James's outperformance of polling expectations despite losing the state's Senate election in 2018. However, most experts still believed Peters to be the more likely winner.

Peters won re-election to a second term, though by a closer margin than expected. James, who outperformed Trump on the same ballot, initially refused to concede, claiming in a statement published to his campaign website two days after the election that he had been "cheated" out of winning the election. The statement alleged that there were "deep concerns that millions of Michiganders may have been disenfranchised by a dishonest few who cheat.". On November 24, James conceded the race exactly three weeks after election day. With a margin of 1.68%, this election was the second-closest race of the 2020 Senate election cycle, behind only the regularly-scheduled election in Georgia.

Democratic primary

Candidates

Nominee
Gary Peters, incumbent U.S. Senator

Declined
Abdul El-Sayed, former executive director of the Detroit Department of Health and Wellness Promotion and candidate for Governor of Michigan in 2018

Endorsements

Democratic primary results

Republican primary

Candidates

Nominee
John James, businessman, Iraq War veteran and nominee for the U.S. Senate in 2018

Disqualified
Bob Carr, historic preservationist, businessman and perennial candidate
Valerie Willis, write-in candidate in the 2018 United States Senate election in Michigan (switched to U.S. Taxpayers candidacy)

Declined
Tom Leonard, former Speaker of the Michigan House of Representatives and nominee for Michigan Attorney General in 2018
Candice Miller, Macomb County Public Works Commissioner and former U.S. Representative for Michigan's 10th congressional district
Sandy Pensler, businessman and candidate for U.S. Senate in 2018
Bill Schuette, former Michigan Attorney General and nominee for Governor of Michigan in 2018 (endorsed John James)
Rick Snyder, former Governor of Michigan

Endorsements

Polling

Results

Other candidates

Communist Party

Withdrawn
Frank Seldon Cupps (as a write-in candidate)

Green Party

Nominee
Marcia Squier (2018 Green Party nominee for US Senate)

Natural Law Party

Nominee
Doug Dern

U.S. Taxpayers Party

Nominee
Valerie L. Willis (switched from Republican candidacy after being disqualified for the Republican primary)

Independents
Leonard Gadzinski

Withdrawn
Gregory Charles Jones

General election

Predictions

Endorsements

Polling

Graphical summary

Aggregate polls

The following poll assumes neither Republican candidate would withdraw after their primary.
with Bob Carr and John James

with Bill Schuette

with Gary Peters and Generic Republican

with Gary Peters and Generic Opponent

with Generic Democrat and Generic Republican

General results
Polls indicated that the race would be close with Peters leading in most polls.  In 2018, Michigan voters approved 'no reason required' absentee balloting.  The COVID-19 pandemic led to a record number of absentee voters. Michigan law does not allow for early tabulating of absentee ballots, so the absentee ballots were tabulated after completing the tabulating of ballots from polling places.  This created a 'mirage' effect because more Republicans voted on Election Day and more Democrats voted by absentee ballot. James was ahead when the counting of Election Day ballots was completed.  When the absentee ballots were tabulated and with 98% of the votes counted, Peters was declared the winner by a tight margin of one percentage point after a day of waiting. When the results were certified on November 23, Peters' margin of victory was 1.68%.

Peters was able to win re-election by running up a big margin in Wayne County, home of Detroit, winning over 67% of the vote there. Peters also managed to improve his performance in the reliably Democratic Washtenaw County, home of Ann Arbor, improving on his 2014 election by almost three percentage points. Peters also came within just 1,139 votes of winning Kent County, home of Grand Rapids, having lost the county by over eight percentage points six years prior. Peters was sworn in for his second term on January 3, 2021. His term will expire on January 3, 2027.

African-Americans in Detroit were a major demographic contributing to Gary Peters winning the election.

James would later be elected as a Representative in Michigan's 10th congressional district in 2022.

Counties that flipped from Democratic to Republican

 Alger (largest municipality: Munising)
 Alpena (largest municipality: Alpena)
 Arenac (largest municipality: Standish)
 Bay (largest municipality: Bay City)
 Benzie (largest municipality: Frankfort)
 Calhoun (largest municipality: Battle Creek)
 Chippewa (largest municipality: Sault Ste. Marie)
 Clare (largest municipality: Clare)
 Clinton (largest municipality: St. Johns)
 Gladwin (largest municipality: Gladwin)
 Gogebic (largest municipality: Ironwood)
 Gratiot (largest municipality: Alma)
 Iosco (largest municipality: East Tawas)
 Isabella (largest municipality: Mount Pleasant)
 Jackson (largest municipality: Jackson)
 Lake (largest municipality: Baldwin)
 Leelanau (largest municipality: Greilickville)
 Macomb (largest municipality: Warren)
 Manistee (largest municipality: Manistee)
 Monroe (largest municipality: Monroe)
 Muskegon (largest municipality: Muskegon)
 Ogemaw (largest municipality: Skidway Lake)
 Presque Isle (largest municipality: Rogers City)
 Roscommon (largest municipality: Houghton Lake)
 Shiawassee (largest municipality: Owosso)
 St. Clair (largest municipality: Port Huron)
 Van Buren (largest municipality: South Haven)

Litigation
After Peters took the lead in the election on the 4th, James refused to concede the race. The following day, James claimed that he had been cheated out of winning the election in a statement published to his campaign website.  The statement said that there were "[...] deep concerns that millions of Michiganders may have been disenfranchised by a dishonest few who cheat" and that "[...] there is enough credible evidence to warrant an investigation to ensure that elections were conducted in a transparent, legal and fair manner."  A lawyer for James' campaign alleged that fraud was committed at the TCF Center, which the Trump campaign had also attempted to claim in a dismissed lawsuit. James conceded the election to Peters on November 24.

See also
 2020 Michigan elections

Notes

Partisan clients

References

Further reading

External links
  (State affiliate of the U.S. League of Women Voters)
 
 
 
 

Official campaign websites
 John E. James (R) for Senate 
 Gary Peters (D) for Senate
 Valerie L. Willis (T) for Senate

2020
Michigan
United States Senate